Matthew Beard (born 9 January 1978) is an English professional football manager, who is currently head coach of FA Women's Super League club Liverpool FC Women. He has managed the side previously, as well as the women's teams of Bristol City on an interim basis, West Ham, Chelsea, Boston Breakers and Millwall.

Coaching career 
Beard had his first coaching job as reserve team manager at non-league Kingstonian FC. He then had coaching stints at Tooting & Mitcham, Hampton & Richmond Borough, and Charlton Athletic Ladies. After Keith Boanas moved to Millwall Lionesses in 2008, Beard went too and succeeded in the Lionesses job when Boanas quit after six months. Beard's first fledgling steps in management guided the team to the FA Women's Premier League Southern Division title in 2008–09.

Chelsea Ladies FC 
Beard was first team manager of Chelsea Ladies FC from 2009 to 2012, helping guide the club to the 2012 FA Women's Cup Final, the FA Premier League Cup Semi-finals, and a third-place finish in the FA National Premier League.

Liverpool FC Women 
He then took a position with Liverpool FC Women for the 2013 and 2014 seasons, and was named FA WSL Manager of the Year in 2013 and 2014. On 22 September 2015, it was announced that Beard was leaving Liverpool FC Women, and had accepted a head coaching position with the Boston Breakers.

West Ham United Women 
In June 2018, he was appointed manager of West Ham United Women. In May 2019, he took the club to the FA Cup Final, where they lost 3-0 to Manchester City at Wembley. On 19 November 2020, Beard and West Ham agreed on his departure from the club by mutual consent.

Liverpool FC Women 
On 13 May 2021 it was announced Beard was appointed manager of Liverpool FC Women, and would return 6 years since he left. He won the FA Women's Championship with them by the end of the season.

Personal life 
Beard and his wife, Debbie, have two children: Harry and Ellie. Matt also has a step-son Scott Hastings from Debbie's first marriage. Scott is a football coach for Chelsea FC.

Honours 
Liverpool Women

 FA Women's Super League: 2012–13, 2013–14
 FA Women's Championship: 2021–22
Individual

 FA WSL Manager of the Season: 2013
 LMA FA Women's Championship Manager of the Year: 2022

References

External links

1978 births
Living people
People from Roehampton
English football managers
Women's Super League managers
National Women's Soccer League coaches
Boston Breakers coaches
Liverpool L.F.C. managers
Chelsea F.C. Women managers
Expatriate soccer managers in the United States
English expatriate football managers
Association football coaches